National Tertiary Route 930, or just Route 930 (or ) is a National Road Route of Costa Rica, located in the Guanacaste province.

Description
In Guanacaste province the route covers Cañas canton (San Miguel, Bebedero districts).

References

Highways in Costa Rica